Guni Kand (also Romanized as Gūnī Kand; also known as Gūnī Kandī and Gūney Kandī) is a village in Angut-e Gharbi Rural District, Anguti District, Germi County, Ardabil Province, Iran. At the 2006 census, its population was 225, in 43 families.

References 

Tageo

Towns and villages in Germi County